Saint-Jean-d'Iberville station is a former railway station in Saint-Jean-sur-Richelieu, Quebec, Canada. The station was built in 1890 by the Grand Trunk Railway and is located at 31 Frontenac Street.

Until September 3, 1966 the Boston & Maine's Montreal to Boston and New York Ambassador made daily stops at the station. The company's night train, Washingtonian southbound to Washington and Montrealer northbound to Montreal made nightly stops at the station until September 6, 1966. The station was omitted from stops when Amtrak reinstated the Montrealer in 1972.

It was recognized as a National Historic Site of Canada on June 15, 1976. Today it operates as a town tourism office.

References

Transport in Saint-Jean-sur-Richelieu
Buildings and structures in Saint-Jean-sur-Richelieu
Disused railway stations in Canada
Grand Trunk Railway stations in Quebec
Railway stations in Canada opened in 1890
National Historic Sites in Quebec